Mattias Remstam (born January 25, 1975, in Nittorp, Sweden) is a professional Swedish ice hockey player, currently playing for Borås HC in the Swedish tier two division HockeyAllsvenskan.

Playing career 
Remstam is big, physical player who often uses his 214 pounds on the ice. He has got good scoring abilities but has from 2006 to 2007 suffered from several injuries. He started plying ice hockey with his hometown hockey club Nittorps IK in the Swedish tier four league system. After seven seasons with the club he was picked up by the Elitserien club HV71 and played for them from 1999 to 2008.

During HV71's last pre-season training match against Södertälje SK Remstam was hit by a hip tackle from Stefan Bemström. Remstam fell to the ice with an injured knee and a cut to his forehead. Later it was concluded that he had suffered a concussion and probably one of his ligaments in the knee was badly injured On October 4, 2006, Remstam played his first 2006–07 Elitserien game after a quick recovery. After five games of season 2007–08, Remstam broke his contract with HV71 due to lacking motivation of playing ice hockey on a professional level. He finished the season, first with KalPa in the Finnish SM-liiga and then Nordsjælland Cobras in the Danish Oddset Ligaen. In the 2008–09 pre-season he signed with Borås HC in the Swedish tier two division HockeyAllsvenskan.

Awards 
 Played in the Elitserien All-Star Game in 2000 and 2001.
 Elitserien playoff winner with HV71 in 2004.

Career statistics 

Statistics as of end of season 2007–08

References 

1975 births
Borås HC players
HV71 players
KalPa players
Living people
Swedish ice hockey right wingers